Alex Bolt and Bradley Mousley were the defending champions but only Mousley chose to defend his title, partnering Akira Santillan. Mousley lost in the first round to Adam and Jason Taylor.

Jeremy Beale and Marc Polmans won the title after defeating Max Purcell and Luke Saville 6–2, 6–4 in the final.

Seeds

Draw

References
 Main Draw

Latrobe City Traralgon ATP Challenger - Doubles
2018 Doubles